Uranophora cincticollis is a moth in the subfamily Arctiinae. It was described by Baron Cajetan von Felder in 1874. It is found in Colombia.

References

Arctiidae genus list at Butterflies and Moths of the World of the Natural History Museum

Moths described in 1874
Euchromiina